The 1957 New Jersey State Senate elections were held on November 5.

The elections coincided with the re-election of Governor Robert Meyner. Ten of New Jersey's 21 counties elected Senators. Democrats gained one seat in Passaic County, where Anthony J. Grossi unseated incumbent Republican Frank W. Shershin.

Incumbents not running for re-election

Democratic
James F. Murray Jr. (Hudson)

Summary of results by county

Close races 
Seats where the margin of victory was under 10%:

 
  

Seats where the margin of victory was 10% or greater; and the seat flipped party control:

  gain

Atlantic

Bergen

Cumberland

Hudson

Hunterdon

Mercer

Morris

Ocean

Passaic

Sussex

References 

New Jersey State Senate elections
New Jersey State Senate